Clonderalaw is an historical barony in County Clare, Ireland. Baronies are geographical divisions of land that are in turn is divided into civil parishes.

Legal context
Baronies were created after the Norman invasion of Ireland as administrative divisions of counties. While baronies have been administratively obsolete since 1898, they continue to be used in some land registration contexts and in planning permissions. In some cases, a barony corresponds to an earlier Gaelic túath which had submitted to the British Crown.

Landscape
The Parliamentary Gazetteer of Ireland of 1845 describes the barony of Clonderalaw as follows,

History

In 1841 the population of Clonderalaw was 29,413 in 4,566 houses. Most were employed in agriculture.

Parishes and settlements
The barony contains the parishes of Kilchrist, Kildysart, Kilfidane, Killimer, Killofin, Kilmichael, and Kilmurray. 
The main villages are Ballynacally, Kildysart, Labasheeda, Knock, and Kilmichael. 
It contains old castles of Clonderalaw, Donogorogue, Redgap, Colesmanstown, Dangan, Crownaghan, Horse-Island, and Cahirmurphy.

References
Citations

Sources

Baronies of County Clare